Djamel is a given name. Notable people with the name include:

Djamel Abdoun (born 1986), French-born Algerian footballer
Djamel Amani (born 1962), former Algerian professional footballer
Djamel Ameziane, Algerian citizen, former resident of Canada, held in the US Guantanamo Bay detention camps
Djamel Bakar (born 1989), French football player of Comorian descent
Djamel Beghal (born 1965), French Algerian man convicted of terrorism
Djamel Belmadi (born 1976), retired Algerian footballer and current head coach of Lekhwiya
Djamel Bouras (born 1971), French judoka of Algerian origin
Djamel Laroussi, Algerian singer, composer, songwriter, arranger and guitar player
Djamel Leeflang (born 1992), Dutch footballer
Djamel Lifa (born 1969), retired boxer from France
Hervé Djamel Loiseau, French soldier burnt to death in the Battle of Tora Bora in December 2001
Djamel Mastouri, Paralympian athlete from France competing mainly in category T37 middle-distance events
Djamel Menad (born 1960), former Algerian international footballer
Djamel Mesbah (born 1984), Algerian footballer
Djamel Tlemçani, (born 1955), former Algerian international football player
Djamel Zidane (born 1955), retired Algerian footballer
Djamel Zitouni (1964–1996), the leader of the Algerian Armed Islamic Group (1994–1996)

See also
Ramdane Djamel District, district in Skikda Province, Algeria